Undertone is a 20+ year old digital advertising company known for high-impact advertising experiences across all platforms. Founded as a subsidiary of Intercept Interactive, a digital media buying company, in 2002. Undertone maintains a leadership position in online marketing, releasing new products ahead of industry changes. Undertone introduced its first full page high impact display products between 2010 and 2012 and has followed with innovative TV and CTV offerings. In both 2021 and 2022 it won a Crain's Business Publications award for Best Places to Work.

History
In 2008, Undertone raised millions to buy up competing companies.(3) It became an independent entity in 2012, after the launch of the proprietary high impact display units PageGrabber and PageSkin. At the time, Undertone's clients included AccuWeather and Britannica.(2)  In 2015 it became part of Perion Network, after an acquisition for $180 million cash. Since then, Undertone has become part of Perion's plan to become a global media industry holding company.

Undertone was described as one of the last independent ad serving platforms in 2009, but has since bought up several competing companies.

Services and products
Current day Undertone creates memorable advertising campaigns across all screens and platforms, including interactive connected TV (CTV). Its formats deliver an average interaction time of 28 seconds, and it beats industry benchmarks by 200% in brand recall and 120% lift in purchase intent. It has a publisher network worthy of its nearly 20-year history, including NBC, abc, CBS and BET. It brings the art and science of advertising together to craft campaigns that uplift consumers, brands and publishers alike. Over the past two years (2020-2022) Undertone has developed several unique products, including the "cookieless" targeting technology called "Smart Optimization of Responsive Traits" SORT (tm) and "Uplift Collective," a premium publisher portfolio of minority, LGBTQIA+ and women publishers aimed at advancing social issues.

Working conditions
Among other benefits, Undertone gives employees 18 paid holidays, 19 including their birthdays, in addition to a flexible time-off policy. Undertone pays 100% of premiums for health, life and disability insurance and gives everyone in the firm stock & 401k matching options. From Memorial Day to Labor Day, the company offers summer Fridays. Paid Parental leave is offered and includes adoptions and surrogacies.  Employees are offered a tuition reimbursement program in addition to many health & wellness events and programs throughout the year. 

Undertone was recognized by Crain's New York in 2008, 2009, 2010, and 2011 as one of the Best Places to Work in New York City. In 2012, Advertising Age named Undertone the 9th Best Place to Work in Marketing & Media for the company's unique culture and emphasis on its employees.

Since 2012, Undertone has collected numerous other awards including OMMA awards, Ad Age's Best Places to work, Crain's Best Places to Work NYC, iab MIXX awards, IAC and in 2020, a Drum award. In the past two years, despite the pandemic, Undertone won Ad Age's Best Places to work award two years in a row.

Acquisitions
In 2008, Undertone raised $47 million from JMI Equity to acquire smaller competitors. In June 2014, Undertone signed an agreement to purchase Israeli digital media company Upfront Digital Media; it made the purchase in particular to benefit from Upfront's proprietary advertising platform. Upfront, which was founded in 2010 as Legolas Media, offered managed and self-serve consoles for programmatic buying of ads direct to publishers and through a number of supply and demand partners.

In June 2015, Undertone announced the acquisition of Sparkflow, an all-in-one platform for cross-screen rich media advertising. Sparkflow was founded in 2013 in Buenos Aires, Argentina by Sebastián Alberto Miret, Gabriel Sánchez Catena, and Rodrigo Oscar Vazquez, a team of digital marketing and advertising veterans with more than a decade's experience in the rich media advertising ecosystem.

References

External links

Official blog
Intercept Interactive homepage

Marketing companies established in 2002
Digital marketing companies of the United States
Companies based in New York City
2002 establishments in New York City